Wairere Boulders is a privately-owned nature reserve and tourist attraction at Horeke in the south Hokianga region of Northland, New Zealand.  The property contains geologically rare rock formations.  Visitors to the property can walk around the various trails, kayak down the boulder river and stay at the campsite.

Ownership
Wairere Boulders was initially developed as a tourist attraction by Felix and Rita Schaad, a couple originally from Switzerland who owned the property from the 1980s. They opened the site for visitors in 2003, after 4 years work developing tracks, bridges and lookouts. The property was put up for sale in 2017.

The  property was purchased by Graham and Paula Grant, who are originally from Scotland. They have subsequently cut a new track, and added a camping site, a coffee caravan, and a bed and breakfast accommodation. The property includes farmland, and the owners raise miniature highland cattle.

Visitor attractions

The main attraction at the property are the large and unusual basalt rock formations.

Walks 
There are several walks ranging from 40 minutes to 3 hours, taking visitors under, over and around the boulders. The gigantic rocks are surrounded by subtropical rainforest, where much of the flora is labelled.  Added interest for families is provided with rock animals, fairy houses and a swimming hole.

Kayaking 
Kayaking is available on the boulder river. The route takes visitors down through mangroves and out to the Hokianga Harbour. Due to the tidal nature of the boulder river, kayaking is tide dependent.

Geology 

The Wairere boulders have slid down the hillsides from an eroding Pliocene basalt lava flow of the Kerikeri volcanic group formerly known as Horeke basalts. Erosion of the clay underlay of the basalt plateau (cap) started to create a v-valley. The edges of the cap broke off. These blocks travelled downwards along the hill sides towards the bottom of the valley, where they accumulated. They fill now a portion of the valley which is about 1.4 km long and up to 350 m wide.

Many of the boulders have deep solution basins and fluting formed on their surfaces as they very slowly slid down the valley sides - a particularly good example of the relatively rare phenomenon of karst formation on basalt (sometimes known as proto-karst). This phenomenon was documented by geologists as early as the 1920s-1940s in Hawaii and New Zealand. Usually karst landforms are formed by solution of calcareous rocks (e.g. limestone and marble) by mildly acidic percolating water. At Wairere, and elsewhere, basalt has been dissolved, probably over a much longer interval of time, by the production of weakly acidic humic acid in the leaf litter that collects around the roots of plants that grow on the top of the boulders, usually beneath a forest canopy. On the top of the boulders this humic acid has etched out solution basins 20–50 cm across and of similar depth. Humic acid seeping down the sides of the boulders has, over thousands of years, dissolved deep, near-vertical flutes out of the hard basalt. In some places the fluting is no longer vertical as the boulders have rolled over or tilted since it was formed.

Basalt karst occurs in a number of places in northern New Zealand with some of the best examples at Wairere Boulders, but also at Stoney Batter, Waiheke Island; Ti Point, Leigh; Lake Manuwai, Kerikeri; and Stoney Knowe, Helena Bay. Excellent examples of karst features developed on basalt boulders can be seen on Norfolk Island, in the Tasman Sea.

See also
List of rock formations in New Zealand

References

External links 

 Wairere Boulders Official website
 Wairere Boulders at GeoTrips

Hokianga
Rock formations of the Northland Region
Tourist attractions in the Northland Region
New Zealand companies established in 2012